Chopsticks (sometimes called Calculator) is a hand game for two or more players, in which players extend a number of fingers from each hand and transfer those scores by taking turns to tap one hand against another. Chopsticks is an example of a combinatorial game, and is solved in the sense that with perfect play, an optimal strategy from any point is known.

Rules
This official set of rules is called rollover where five fingers are subtracted should a hand's sum exceeds 5 as described below.
 A hand is live if it has at least one finger, and this is indicated by raising at least one finger. If a hand has zero fingers, the hand is dead, and this is indicated by raising zero fingers (i.e. a closed fist). 
 If any hand of any player reaches exactly five fingers, then the hand is dead.
 Each player begins with one finger raised on each hand. After the first player turns proceed clockwise.
 On a player's turn, they must either attack or split. There are two types of splits, transfers and divisions.
 To attack, a player uses one of their live hands to strike an opponent's live hand. The number of fingers on the opponent's struck hand will increase by the number of fingers on the hand used to strike.
 To transfer, a player strikes their own two hands together, and transfers raised fingers from one hand to the other as desired. However, a player cannot transfer fingers to make a hand have more than 4 fingers. 
 If a player has a dead hand, the player can divide the fingers between the other hand and the dead hand by transferring fingers from the other hand to the dead hand. However, players are required to attack at least once during the game.
 A player with two dead hands is eliminated from the game.
 A player wins once all opponents are eliminated.
 If you go over 5 you subtract the sum of all of the numbers by 5 game.
I've studied this game for many years as it progressed into the game it is back in 190 b.c. the Roman kingdom had the first ever recorded game of chopsticks and from now on the game has progressed into the top of the line game it is now.

Abbreviation
A chopsticks position can be easily abbreviated to a four-digit code [ABCD]. A and B are the hands (in ascending order of fingers) of the player who is about to take their turn. C and D are the hands (in ascending order of fingers) of the player who is not about to take their turn. It is important to notate each player's hands in ascending order, so that a single distinct position isn't accidentally represented by two codes. For example, the code [1032] is not allowed, and should be notated [0123].

Therefore, the starting position is [1111]. The next position must be [1211]. The next position must be either [1212] or [1312]. Treating each position as a 4-digit number, the smallest position is 0000, and the largest position is 4444.

This abbreviation formula expands easily to games with more players. A three-player game can be represented by six-digits (e.g. [111211]), where each pair of adjacent digits represents a single player, and each pair is ordered based on when players will take their turns. The leftmost pair represents the hands of the player about to take his turn; the middle pair represents the player who will go next, and so on. The rightmost pair represents the player who must wait the longest before his turn (usually because he just went).

Moves
Under normal rules, there are a maximum of 14 possible moves:

 Four attacks (A-C, A-D, B-C, B-D)
 Four divisions (02–11, 03–12, 04–13, 04–22)
 Six transfers (13–22, 22–13, 14–23, 23–14, 24–33, 33–24)

However, only 5 or less of these are available on a given turn. For example, the early position 1312 can go to 2213, 1313, 2413, 0113, or 1222.

Game lengths
The shortest possible game is 5 moves. There is one instance:
 1111 1211 1312 0113 1401 0014

The longest possible game that gets farther from the starting point with each move is 9 moves. There are two instances:
 1111 1211 1212 2212 2322 0223 0202 0402 0104 0001
 1111 1211 1212 2312 2323 0323 0303 0103 0401 0004

The longest possible game with revisitation is indefinite.

Positions

Since the roll-over amount is 5, chopsticks is a base-5 game. Each position is four digits long. Counting from 0000 to 4444 (in base-5) yields 625 positions. However, most of these positions are incorrect notations (e.g. 0132, 1023, and 1032). They appear different but are functionally the same in gameplay. To find the number of functionally distinct positions, square the number of functionally distinct pairs. There are 15 distinct pairs (00, 01, 02, 03, 04, 11, 12, 13, 14, 22, 23, 24, 33, 34, and 44). Since either player could have any of these pairs, we simply multiply 15*15, which gives 225 functionally distinct positions.

 There are 625 positions, including redundancies.
 There are 225 functionally distinct positions.
 There are 204 reachable positions.

There are 21 unreachable positions: 0000, 0100, 0200, 0300, 0400, 1100, 1101, 1200, 1300, 1400, 2200, 2202, 2300, 2400, 3300, 3303, 3400, 3444, 4400, 4404, and 4444.  
15 of these are simply one player having each of the 15 distinct pairs, and the other player being dead. The problem is that the dead player is the player who just took his turn (hence the "00" on the right side). Since the player can't lose on their own turn, these  positions are obviously unreachable. 
4 of those pairs are where the player to move having [kk], and the other player having [0k], where . This is unreachable because the player who just went [0k] would not be able to split, so therefore that player must have attacked using his [0k]. But there's no way to use [0k] to attack an enemy so that they move to [kk]. That would require attacking a dead hand, which is illegal. 
The remaining two positions are 3444 and 4444. 4444 is unreachable because a player cannot reach [44] from a split, and therefore had to already have [44]. The only possible pair that goes to [44] after being attacked by [44] is [04], which again requires that a dead hand be attacked. 3444 is actually reachable, but only from 4444. Since 4444 is not reachable from 4444, neither is 3444.

There are 14 reachable endgames: 0001, 0002, 0003, 0004, 0011, 0012, 0013, 0014, 0022, 0023, 0024, 0033, 0034, 0044. Satisfyingly enough, these are all the 14 possible endgames; in other words, someone can win using any of the 14 distinct live pairs. Out of these 14 endgames, the first player wins 8 of them, assuming that the games are ended in the minimum amount of moves.

Variations
 Misère: First player to have both of their hands killed wins.
 Suicide: Players are allowed to kill one of their own hands with a split. For example, in the position [1201], a player could execute 12–03, thus bringing the game to [0103]. The opponent is forced to play B-D, bringing the game to [0401], at which point a quick win for the first player is possible.
 Swaps/Cherri: If players have two unequal live hands, they may swap them (though forfeiting their turn). This variation commonly yields a draw by repetition or infinite loop for obvious reasons. To avoid this, limits can be placed on the number of consecutive swaps a player can do without being attacked before they are forced to attack.
 Sudden Death: Players lose when they only have one finger left (on both hands). Alternately, each player could begin with three lives, and every time they get down to [01], they lose a life.
 Meta: If a player's hands add up to over five, they can combine them, subtract five from the total, and then split up the remainder. For example, [44] adds up to 8. Under Meta rules, 4 and 4 can be combined into 8, which becomes 3 after subtracting five; these can then be split into [12]. Therefore, it is possible to go from [44] to [12] in a single move. Meta unlocks 2 new possible moves (34–11, 44–12). If playing both Meta and Suicide, four additional moves are unlocked (24–01, 33–01, 34–02, 44–03), for a maximum of 20 possible moves in total.
 Logan Clause: Players are allowed to suicide and swap, but only if doing both simultaneously (i.e. swapping a dead hand for a live one).
 Cutoff: If a hand gets above five fingers, it is dead (as opposed to rollover, described in the official rules).
 Zombies: With three or more players, if a player is knocked out, then they are permanently reduced to one finger on one hand. On their turn, they may attack, but may not split or be attacked (invented by Chris Bandy).
 Transfers only: Divisions are not allowed. The only splits allowed are transfers. 
 Divisions only: Transfers are not allowed. The only splits allowed are divisions. 
 Halvesies: Splitting is only allowed when dividing an even number into two equal halves, or optionally, an odd number being divided as evenly as possible (using whole numbers). In this variation, the second player has a winning strategy (can always force a win).
 Stumps: If a player is at [01], it is legal to split into [0.5 0.5]. 
 More Hands: Each player has more than two hands. This is usually played in teams of multiple people, as people only have two hands. With more hands per player, different transfer, division, swapping, and suicide rules are possible, and include but are not limited to:
 Single transfer: Each player can transfer fingers between only two hands. 
 Multiple transfer: Each player can transfer fingers between more than two hands, so long as the resulting state is differeng from the original states
 Single Division: The player can transfer fingers from only one hand to only one dead hand. 
 Partition: The player can transfer fingers from only one hand to multiple dead hands. 
 Transfer and partition: The player can transfer fingers from multiple hands to revive dead hands. 
 Different Numbers: A hand dies when it reaches a positive number .  is the standard Chopsticks variant. Different hand counting systems could be used for numbers greater than 5 such as Chinese hand numerals, senary finger counting, and finger binary. This variation often includes rollovers. 
 Suns: Both players start with a 4 in each of their hands ([4444]). This is a position that is unreachable in normal gameplay (i.e. from the opening position [1111]).
 Integers: It is permitted to swap one of one's own hands by flipping it over, changing the +/- sign of the hand. This allows for negative and zero value hands, though a hand still dies at 5 or -5. With roll-over, this action becomes identical to replacing the value of the hand with 5 minus the value.
 Unnamed: Attacking own hands are allowed, adding two additional moves (A-B, B-A). Typically played in conjunction with Swap and Cutoff variants.
 Cherry Bomb: Transferring to exactly 5 will cause the user's hand to become [1 1] and an attacked player to lose a hand, and that player's other hand becomes 1. Basically, the position becomes [1101] in a 1 versus 1 game. In a 1 versus one game, it becomes an easy forced win, so it is best played with more than 2 people.

Optimal strategy
Using the rules above, two perfect players will play indefinitely; the game will continue in a loop. In fact, even very inexperienced players can avoid losing by simply looking one move ahead.

In the cutoff variation, the first player can force a win. One winning strategy is to always reach one of the following configurations after each move, preferentially choosing the first one in the list if there is more than one choice. 
 [1211] (starting here)
 [ab12], where a and b can be any number of fingers (winning immediately if possible)

Conversely, in the Division and Suicide only variation, then the second player has a winning strategy.

Generalisations
Chopsticks can be generalized into a (p,r)-type game, where p is the number of players and r is the roll-over amount.

Fewer than two players
A game with one player trivially wins the game for virtue of being the last player in the game. A game with zero players is likewise trivial for there are no players in the game and thus no winners.

Two players
 There are  positions, including redundancies.
 There are  functionally distinct positions.
 For , there are  reachable positions.

Each position is  digits long. Enumerating all numbers in base- with  digits gives us  positions. However, most of these positions are incorrect notations (e.g. 1002, 0120, and 1020). They appear different but are functionally the same in gameplay. To find the number of functionally distinct positions, we square the number of functionally distinct pairs. Since either player could have any of these pairs, we simply square the resulting value, which gives us  functionally distinct positions.

 of these are simply one player having each of the  distinct pairs, and the other player being dead. The problem is that the dead player is the player who just took his turn. Since the player can't lose on their own turn, these positions are obviously unreachable. 
These positions are unreachable because the player who only has one alive hand of value  would not be able to split, so therefore that player must have attacked using his sole alive head. But there is no way to use his sole alive hand to attack an enemy so that they have two hands of value , as that would require attacking a dead hand, which is illegal. 
 The position when both players have two hands of value . These position are unreachable because any player who only has hands of value  would not be able to split, so therefore that player must have attacked using one of his value  hands. But there is no way to use an  valued hand so that they have  hands of value , as that would require attacking a dead hand, which is illegal. 
 The position when the player whose turn it is has one hand of value  and one hand of value , and the other player has two hands of value . This position is only reachable from the previous position, but the previous position is not reachable from the starting position, so this position isn't either.

More than two players
Given a roll-over of 5.
 With 2 players, there are 204 positions.
 With 3 players, there are 3,337 positions.
 With 4 players, there are over 25,000 positions.

Degenerate cases
A game with a roll-over amount of 1 is the trivial game, because all hands are dead at start as values of one become values of zero.

A game with a roll-over amount of 2 is degenerate, because splitting is impossible and the roll-over and cutoff variations result in the same game. Hands are either 'alive' and 'dead', and attacking a hand kills the hand. In fact, one could simply keep count of the number of 'hands' a player has (by using fingers or some other method of counting), and when a player attacks an opponent, the number of hands that opponent has decreases by one. The two player game is strongly solved as a first person win.

When two players have only one hand, the game becomes degenerate, because splits cannot occur and each player only has one move. The number of positions is given by least positive number  such that  divides . This variant is strongly solved as a win for either side depending upon  and the divisibility properties of Fibonacci numbers.

See also
 Morra (game) – a different hand-game, which is based on chance rather than logic.

References

External links
 Unbeatable Chopsticks AI Bot. This bot plays the game with rollovers and transfers.

Children's games
Hand games
Abstract strategy games
Solved games
Combinatorial game theory